David Kyte Doyle  (8 December 1931 – 8 May 2021) was a lieutenant general in the United States Army who served as Assistant Chief of Staff for Information Management. An alumnus of the University of Maryland, he was commissioned following completion of Officer Candidate School. Doyle received a B.S. degree in military science from the University of Maryland, an M.S. degree in international relations from George Washington University and a Master of Military Arts and Sciences degree from the U.S. Army Command and General Staff College.

References

1931 births
2021 deaths
People from Pottsville, Pennsylvania
University System of Maryland alumni
United States Army personnel of the Vietnam War
Recipients of the Silver Star
Recipients of the Air Medal
George Washington University alumni
United States Army Command and General Staff College alumni
Recipients of the Legion of Merit
United States Army generals
Recipients of the Distinguished Service Medal (US Army)